Maddie Taylor (formerly Matthew W. Taylor) is an American voice actress and storyboard artist, known for voicing Verminious Snaptrap in T.U.F.F. Puppy and Sparky in The Fairly OddParents.

Career
While starting as a storyboard artist at Sony Pictures Animation, Taylor lent her voice to Deni, the crazed duck, and Buddy, the blue porcupine, in the studio's first full feature Open Season, as well as voicing Elliot in the video game adaptation, replacing Ashton Kutcher. In the film's two sequels, she replaced Patrick Warburton as the strong mule deer Ian in Open Season 2, and replaced Joel McHale as the voice of Elliot in Open Season 3, before being replaced by Will Townsend in Open Season: Scared Silly.

Within 2006, she provided ADR voices for George W. Bush for the South Park episode "Mystery of the Urinal Deuce", but was not included in the credits.

Taylor was cast in T.U.F.F. Puppy as Verminious Snaptrap and in The Fairly OddParents as Sparky in 2013, both of which are developed by Nickelodeon and created by Butch Hartman.

In late 2016, Taylor provided the voice for the interactive character, Gary the Gull, for the PlayStation VR. Since her transition, Taylor has been voicing more female characters. Her character in The Loud House, Dana Dufresne, transitioned to reflect her own transition.

In December 2020, Taylor provided the voice for the character of Claire Russell, a transgender bartender of the Afterlife bar in the video game Cyberpunk 2077.

In 2023, Taylor voiced Torga, a recurring character in My Dad the Bounty Hunter.

Personal life
In 2016, Taylor publicly came out as a bisexual trans woman.

Filmography

Film

Television

Video games

Commercials
 Kraft Mac & Cheese as Cheesasaurus Rex

References

External links
 

Living people
21st-century American actresses
American impressionists (entertainers)
American film actresses
American television actresses
American video game actresses
American voice actresses
American puppeteers
American women comedians
American storyboard artists

Bisexual actresses
Transgender actresses
LGBT people from Michigan
American LGBT actors
21st-century American comedians
Sony Pictures Animation people
Year of birth missing (living people)